Peter M. Donohue  is an American academic administrator and Roman Catholic priest who was inaugurated as Villanova University's 32nd President on September 8, 2006. He had served as the Chair of the Villanova Theatre Department since 1992.

Early life and education 
Donohue was born in The Bronx, and raised in Royal Oak, Michigan. Donohue received his bachelor's degree from Villanova University in 1975. Ordained in the Order of Saint Augustine in 1979, Donohue received his Master of Arts degree in theater from the Catholic University of America in 1983 and a Master of Divinity degree from Washington Theological Union in 1985. He was conferred a Doctor of Philosophy degree in theater from the University of Illinois at Urbana-Champaign in 1990, while also managing the Krannert Center for the Performing Arts.

Career 
His early years as an educator were spent serving the St. Augustine Parish in Andover, Massachusetts, and at Archbishop John Carroll High School in Washington, D.C. From 1985 through 1990, he was an instructor in Villanova's Theater Department.

While at Villanova, he designed The Augustinian Connection, a history of the Augustinian Friars and their involvement with Villanova University, which is shown to all incoming Freshmen during New Student Orientation. He has served as a resident hall minister and as chaplain of Villanova's renowned Naval ROTC program, and presides over their annual commissioning Mass.

Donohue has served as a faculty representative on the Villanova Board of Trustees, the Academic Affairs Committee, the University's College of Liberal Arts & Sciences Diversity Committee, the University's Judicial Boards, the Strategic Planning Committee, the Fine Arts Subcommittee Curriculum Program, the College Diversity Subcommittee, the Planning Committee for the Church in the Modern World Conference, and the Preparation Committee for Rhodes Scholars Interviews. In addition, Donohue served on the Board of Trustees of Merrimack College from 1994 to 2002.

In addition to his work with the University, Donohue is known as the director of the University's spring musical each year, with several Barrymore Award nominations to his credit. He has received nominations for his direction of Parade, Children of Eden, Into the Woods, Evita, and Chicago which received nine nominations and three awards, including Outstanding Direction of a Musical. Other directing credits include Candide, Once on This Island, The Mystery of Edwin Drood, A Funny Thing Happened on the Way to the Forum, and West Side Story. As an actor, Donohue has been seen in Twelfth Night, Don Juan, The Trojan Women, and The Passion of Christ.

He has presided over 500 weddings for Villanova students and alumni, and has been known to preside over the Sunday evening "student" masses at St. Thomas of Villanova Church.

References

Sources
Biography, Villanova University web site

Augustinian friars
Catholic University of America alumni
Villanova University alumni
Villanova University faculty
Presidents of Villanova University
University of Illinois College of Fine and Applied Arts alumni
Living people
Washington Theological Union alumni
Year of birth missing (living people)